Pionersky Radar Station is an early warning radar station near Pionersky in Kaliningrad Oblast, Russia. It is a key part of the Russian early warning system against missile attacks and is run by the Russian Aerospace Defence Forces.

The radar is modular and can be put into testing mode before being fully completed.  It was announced in November 2011 that the radar was operational but without a fully completed array. Previously Oleg Ostapenko, commander of the Russian Space Forces was quoted as saying in January 2011 that it had started working whilst being built  and Vladimir Popovkin, then First Deputy Minister of Defence, was quoted as saying in February 2011 that it will not be complete until 2016. It is fully operational in 2014.

The radar is estimated to cost 4.43 billion rubles.

Voronezh radar

Voronezh radar are highly prefabricated radars needing fewer personnel and using less energy than previous generations. The one being built in Pionersky is a Voronezh-DM, a UHF radar with a 6,000 km stated range.

References

Russian Space Forces
Russian and Soviet military radars
Military installations of Russia